Arlynda Corners is a locality in Humboldt County, California.

The name "Arlynda" was selected in 1882.  Arlynda Corners was a cross-roads village between Ferndale and Port Kenyon, California.  Currently a few buildings remain of the original town at Market Streets and Port Kenyon Roads.

References

Former settlements in Humboldt County, California
Populated places established in 1882